Andriy Slinkin (born 19 February 1991) is a Ukrainian footballer who plays as a left back.

Career
In 2022 he moved to FK Jonava

Honours
Chornomorets Odesa
 Ukrainian Cup Runner-up: 2012–13   
 Ukrainian Super Cup Runner-up: 2013

References

External links 
 
 
 FPL profile
 Player's profile on club's official website (Russian)

1991 births
Living people
Ukrainian footballers
Ukrainian expatriate footballers
Association football defenders
Footballers from Odesa
FC Chornomorets Odesa players
FC Chornomorets-2 Odesa players
PFC Sumy players
FK Senica players
CSF Bălți players
FC Dacia Chișinău players
FC Desna Chernihiv players
MFC Mykolaiv players
FK Ventspils players
FC Peremoha Dnipro players
FC Nyva Vinnytsia players
FC Shevardeni-1906 Tbilisi players
Slovak Super Liga players
Moldovan Super Liga players
Ukrainian Premier League players
Ukrainian First League players
Ukrainian Second League players
Latvian Higher League players
Expatriate footballers in Slovakia
Expatriate footballers in Moldova
Expatriate footballers in Latvia
Expatriate footballers in Georgia (country)
Ukrainian expatriate sportspeople in Slovakia
Ukrainian expatriate sportspeople in Moldova
Ukrainian expatriate sportspeople in Latvia
Ukrainian expatriate sportspeople in Georgia (country)